Aneiki is an Australian pop duo from Brisbane, Queensland made up of Jennifer Waite and Grant Wallis. The duo was originally called Halogen, but were forced to change their name after a Perth-based Halogen (band) established sole rights to the name's usage in Australia.

Their band name is a Japanese word meaning “Big Sister”. 

Aneiki worked with songwriter Daniel Jones and were signed to his label, Meridienmusik. Their debut single, "Pleased to Meet You", reached #26 on the ARIA singles chart, spending 18 weeks in the top 100 and was #13 on 2001's Australian Artist Singles chart. "Pleased To Meet You" was the most played Australian song on Australian radio in 2002. Waite and Wallis were awarded APRA's Breakthrough Songwriter of the Year in 2002, an award they shared with Sia. 

Follow-up singles "Superhero", "15 Minutes" and "Even Without You" reached #48, #72 and #97. Their debut album Words in Place of Objects reached #87 on the ARIA albums chart.

Discography

Albums

Singles

References

External links
Aneiki MySpace page

Musical groups from Brisbane